Irish Bend Covered Bridge is a wooden covered bridge near Corvallis, Oregon, United States. It was constructed in 1954 and originally spanned the Willamette Slough on Irish Bend Road near Monroe. However, in 1975 Irish Bend Road was realigned and the bridge fell into a state of disrepair. The bridge was added to the National Register of Historic Places in 1979. It was eventually dismantled in 1988 to make way for a more modern concrete span.  Through negotiations with Benton County and Oregon State University (OSU), an agreement was reached to reconstruct the bridge on university property. $30,000 was raised by the Irish Bend Advisory Committee, and Benton County provided an additional $30,000 to fund the project, which was completed in 1989.  Due to the relocation, the bridge was removed from the National Register in 1989. It was relisted in 2013.

Today, the bridge is part of a path through the research farm between 35th and 53rd Streets on the west side of the OSU campus, spanning Oak Creek. Although the property is owned by the university, maintenance is carried out by the Benton County Parks Department.

See also 
 List of bridges on the National Register of Historic Places in Oregon
 List of Oregon covered bridges

References

External links
Oak Creek (Irish Bend) Covered Bridge

1954 establishments in Oregon
Bridges completed in 1954
Bridges in Benton County, Oregon
Covered bridges on the National Register of Historic Places in Oregon
Buildings and structures in Corvallis, Oregon
Former road bridges in the United States
National Register of Historic Places in Benton County, Oregon
Oregon State University
Pedestrian bridges in Oregon
Tourist attractions in Benton County, Oregon
Wooden bridges in Oregon
Relocated buildings and structures in Oregon
Road bridges on the National Register of Historic Places in Oregon
Howe truss bridges in the United States